The Lindens may refer to:
 The Lindens (Washington, D.C.), listed on the National Register of Historic Places (NRHP)
 The Lindens (Bryantown, Maryland), listed on the NRHP

See also 
 Linden Labs, the creators of the virtual world Second Life
 Linden (disambiguation)